Vittjärvs IK is a Swedish football club located in Boden.

Background
Vittjärvs IK currently plays in Division 5 Norrbotten Norra which is the seventh tier of Swedish football. They play their home matches at the Tjärnbacken Vittjärv in Boden.

The club is affiliated to Norrbottens Fotbollförbund.

Season to season

In their most successful period Vittjärvs IK competed in the following divisions:

In recent seasons Vittjärvs IK have competed in the following divisions:

Footnotes

External links
 Vittjärvs IK – Official website
 Vittjärvs IK on Facebook

Sport in Norrbotten County
Football clubs in Norrbotten County
1924 establishments in Sweden